Lost and Found (Volume 2) is the ninth album by Ezio, released in 2006. Despite its name, there is no Volume 1 – the album is a collection of songs which, according to the quote from Ezio himself "didn't make it at the time or evolved into something else". Three of the songs ("Call you tomorrow", "Alex" and" Cinderella") were released by the band on other albums, and one (Ancora) is an Italian version of another previously released song, "Just to talk to you again", which features on both Black Boots on Latin Feet and Live at the Shepherds Bush Empire.

Track listing

All songs written by Ezio Lunedei.

"Hey Andy" – 3:25
"Call you tomorrow" – 3:31
"Ancora" – 4:19
"Alex" – 3:10
"All the dreams"  - 4:38
"All for you" – 4:41
"The Ballad of Zoe and Jesus" – 3:42
"Girl in the dream" – 3:31
"Turn around" – 3:36
"Wake up" – 3:23
"Cinderella" – 3:48

See also
2006 in music

Ezio (band) albums
2006 compilation albums